Eugongylus is a genus of skinks in the subfamily Eugongylinae. It was previously recognised as namesake of the Eugonglyus group of genera within Lygosominae, where it occupied a quite basal position. Members of this genus are commonly called mastiff skinks or short-legged giant skinks.

Species
The following species are recognized as being valid.
Eugongylus albofasciolatus  – white-banded mastiff skink, white-banded giant skink, white-striped cape skink, barred shark skink
Eugongylus mentovarius  – odd-chinned mastiff skink, odd-chinned giant skink

Eugongylus rufescens  – bar-lipped sheen-skink
Eugongylus sulaensis  – Sula skink
Eugongylus unilineatus 

Notabene: A binomial authority in parentheses indicates that the species was originally described in a genus other than Eugongylus.

References

Further reading
Fitzinger L. 1843. Systema Reptilium, Fasciculus Primus, Amblyglossae. Vienna: Braumüller & Seidel. 106 pp. + indices. (Eugongylus, new genus, p. 23). (in Latin).

 
Lizard genera
Taxa named by Leopold Fitzinger